2015 Champions League may refer to:

Football
2014–15 UEFA Champions League
2015–16 UEFA Champions League
2015 AFC Champions League
2015 CAF Champions League
2015 GCC Champions League

Cricket
2015 Champions League Twenty20